Nicolls' Outpost was the smaller and more northern of two forts built by British Lt. Col. Edward Nicolls during the War of 1812. (The Americans referred to it as Fort Apalachicola. Built at the end of 1814, together with the larger "British post" or storage depot down the Apalachicola, it was "the northernmost post built by the British during their Gulf Coast Campaign". It was just below the Spanish Florida–Georgia border, where the Flint and Chattahoochee Rivers meet to form the Apalachicola, in River Landing Park in modern Chattahoochee, Florida. Even though what was built was smaller than the much larger British post down the Apalachicola, it was intended to be the base, presumably enlarged, for an English invasion of the United States, and British post was to have been its supply depot. The 1815 end of the War of 1812 aborted this project.

It was built atop the largest of three surviving mounds of the prehistoric Fort Walton culture. Above the winter flood stage of the Apalachicola, it could reach both forks of the river with cannon fire. It was built in 1814 and abandoned early in 1815, at the end of the war. It was armed with a -inch howitzer. It also had a coehorn, a mortar that could fire 24-pound shells. According to a report of U.S. Colonel and Indian agent Benjamin Hawkins, there were "200 troops white and black and an assemblage of 500 [Creek] Warriors", "well supplied with cloth[e]s and munitions of War".  The intention was to mount an expedition "up the river" (the Flint), bringing the cannon along. Georgia militia, other U.S. forces, and the faction of the Creek allied with the U.S. (the Lower Creeks) were preparing upriver (in Georgia) for a battle. News of the treaty ending the war (Treaty of Ghent), which reached both sides in February 1815, prevented the battle from taking place. The British abandoned both of its forts on the Apalachicola, leaving them in the hands of the black Corps of Colonial Marines that Nicolls had trained, and of Red Stick Creek Neamathla and his warriors.

Council of 1815

Before abandoning the Fort, an important council (meeting) took place there on March 10, 1815. The meeting was between Red Stick Creek leaders Neamathla, Francis the Prophet (Josiah Francis), Peter McQueen, and more than 30 other indigenous people, and Lt. Col. Nicolls and four other British officers, passing through on their way to British ships to return them to other British colonies (Bahamas, Jamaica, Trinidad) or to England. "The council included representatives from towns or groups of Lower Creeks, Red Sticks, Miccosukee, Alachua, Yuchi and Choctaw. Languages spoken included Hitchiti, Yuchi, and Choctaw. In short, a wide range of cultures was combining into the group that we know today as Seminoles." In retrospect, this was the founding of the Seminoles, a loose alliance of various groups of indigenous refugees in Spanish Florida, although they did not set up a central authority, which was "extremely difficult for the United States military to understand. ... The political and social complications at play in the developing Seminole Nation were utterly incomprehensible to American settlers and officials." The person who did understand them, Indian agent Hawkins, died in 1816.

The Treaty of Ghent stated that indigenous peoples were to be restored "all possessions, rights and privileges which they may have enjoyed, or been entitled to in 1811". The meeting was to point out to the British that having assisting them, the Creeks faced even greater hostility from the Americans. They claimed to be subjects of Britain, and asked British assistance in recovering their lands.

Treaty of Nicolls' Outpost
The most important outcome of the meeting was the little-known Treaty of Nicolls' Outpost. In it, the Creeks promised allegiance to Great Britain, which in turn accepted them as subjects of the British empire. The hope was that Britain would provide them with protection against the United States, so they could recover the land taken since 1811, more specifically that taken in the Treaty of Fort Jackson, which they, the Red Stick Creeks, had not signed and which, they claimed, did not apply to them. Nicolls, a champion of indigenous rights, created this treaty on his own initiative, without authorization.

The outcome was the famous trip of Francis the Prophet to London, together with Nicolls, to seek "recognition and assistance" from Great Britain. The British government, in no way interested in further conflict with the United States, summarily rejected the Treaty, sent Francis home, and chastised Nicolls.

Historical marker
A historical marker has been erected at the site:

See also
 Prospect Bluff Historic Sites

Further reading

References

War of 1812
Gadsden County, Florida
British forts in the United States
Wars between the United States and Native Americans
Spanish Florida
Pre-statehood history of Florida
Seminole
Tourist attractions in Gadsden County, Florida
Former populated places in Florida
Buildings and structures in Gadsden County, Florida
Negro Fort